Archduke Friedrich, Duke of Teschen (Friedrich Maria Albrecht Wilhelm Karl; 4 June 1856 – 30 December 1936) was a member of the House of Habsburg and the supreme commander of the Austro-Hungarian Army during World War I.

Early life 
Friedrich was born at the castle of Gross Seelowitz in Moravia (today Židlochovice near Brno in the Czech Republic), the son of Karl Ferdinand, Archduke of Austria and his wife Archduchess Elisabeth Franziska of Austria.

His siblings included Queen Maria Cristina of Spain, Archduke Charles Stephen of Austria, a candidate for the Kingdom of Poland, and Archduke Eugen of Austria, an Austrian officer.

When Friedrich's uncle Archduke Albert, Duke of Teschen died in 1895, he and his brothers each inherited large estates. Friedrich owned properties at Ungarisch-Altenburg (now Mosonmagyaróvár in Hungary), Belleje, Saybusch (now Żywiec in Poland), Seelowitz (now Židlochovice) and Frýdek in the Czech Republic, and Pressburg (now Bratislava in Slovakia). His Vienna residence, the Palais-Albrecht, housed the Albertina art collection which he owned.

Marriage 
On 8 October 1878 Friedrich married at Château de l'Hermitage in France, Princess Isabella of Croÿ (1856–1931), daughter of Rudolf, Duke of Croÿ, and his wife Princess Natalie of Ligne. They had nine children together.

 Archduchess Maria Christina of Austria-Teschen (17 November 1879 - 6 August 1962) she married Prince Manuel of Salm-Salm on 10 May 1902. They have four children.
  Archduchess Maria Anna of Austria-Teschen (6 January 1882 - 25 February 1940) she married Elias, Duke of Parma on 25 May 1903. They have eight children. 
 Archduchess Maria Henrietta of Austria-Teschen (10 January 1883 - 2 September 1956) she married Prince Gottfried of Hohenlohe-Waldenburg-Schillingfurst on 3 June 1908. They have three children.
 Archduchess Natalie of Austria-Teschen (12 January 1884 - 23 March 1898)
 Archduchess Stephanie of Austria-Teschen (1 May 1886 - 25 August 1890)
 Archduchess Gabriele of Austria-Teschen (14 September 1887-15 November 1954)
 Archduchess Isabella of Austria-Teschen (17 November 1888 - 6 December 1973) she married Prince Georg of Bavaria on 10 February 1912 (marriage dissolved). 
 Archduchess Maria Alice of Austria-Teschen (15 January 1893 - 1 July 1962) she married Friedrich Heinrich Carl Maria Baron Waldbott von Bassenheim, son of Friedrich Lothar Baron Waldbott von Bassenheim and Hedwig Baronin von Beust, on 8 May 1920. They have six children. 
 Albrecht Franz, Duke of Teschen (24 July 1897 - 23 July 1955) he married Irene Lelbach on 16 August 1930 and they were divorced on 1 June 1937. He then married Katalin Bocskay de Felsö-Banya on 9 May 1938 and they were divorced in 1951. They had two daughters. He remarried, again, Lydia Strauss-Dorner after 1951. They had one son.

Military career 

Like most of the princes of the ruling house, Friedrich adopted a military career, and served creditably for many years as commandant of the V. (Pressburg) Corps. Subsequently, commander-in-chief of the Austrian Landwehr (militia) and army inspector, he became, after the murder of the heir to the throne, Archduke Franz Ferdinand, inspector-general of the Austro-Hungarian Army.

In World War I, he was —from the dynastic point of view —as grandson of the victor of the Battle of Aspern, Archduke Charles, and as nephew of the victor of the Battle of Custoza, Archduke Albert, the predestined head of the armed forces of Austria-Hungary; and on 11 July 1914 Friedrich was appointed supreme commander of the Austro-Hungarian Army by Emperor Franz Joseph I. He thought it his duty to accept this heavy responsibility, but, modestly underestimating his own powers, left the actual exercise of the command to his chief-of-staff, Franz Graf Conrad von Hötzendorf. In the performance of ceremonial duties, and as mediator for the settlement of the conflicting demands of the military, civil and allied elements, his services were undeniable. He was promoted to the rank of Generalfeldmarschall on 8 December 1914. In February 1917 Emperor Charles himself took over the supreme command; the Archduke, although the Emperor's representative, no longer appeared in the foreground.

Retirement and death 
After World War I the governments of Austria and Czechoslovakia confiscated all of Friedrich's properties within their borders.  These included his palaces in Pressburg and in Vienna and his art collection.  He retained his properties in Hungary however.  In 1929 he won a court case requiring compensation from the Czechoslovak government.

Friedrich died at Ungarisch-Altenburg  (Magyaróvár, now Mosonmagyaróvár) in 1936. His death was the biggest royal event for Hungary since the coronation of King Karl in 1916. The funeral and burial in the parish church in Mosonmagyaróvár was attended by his nephew, the exiled King of Spain; by numerous archdukes; by all the surviving Austro-Hungarian field marshals; by personal representatives of Hitler; by members of the House of Savoy; by the diplomatic corps; by a son of exiled German Kaiser Wilhelm; by representatives of the governments of Germany, Italy and Austria, and by Hungary's regent, Miklós Horthy and his wife. There were members of the Hungarian government and delegates of the German and Austrian in attendance as well. Entire battalions of the Royal Hungarian Army were present to pay their last respects to their former supreme commander.

Decorations and awards
Friedrich received the following decorations and awards:

National orders and decorations
 Knight of the Golden Fleece, 17 April 1873
 Military Merit Cross, 30 November 1892; in Diamonds, 30 November 1898; 1st Class with War Decoration, 9 May 1915
 Grand Cross of St. Stephen, 9 November 1893
 Bronze Military Merit Medal ("Signum Laudis"), September 1899; Gold Medal ("Großes Signum Laudis") on the ribbon of the Military Merit Cross, 17 October 1916
 Red Cross Merit Star, 21 August 1914; with War Decoration, 15 February 1915
 Grand Cross of the Military Order of Maria Theresa, 25 November 1916
 Long Service Cross for Officers, 2nd Class
 Bronze Jubilee Medal for the Armed Forces
 Military Jubilee Medal

Foreign orders and decorations

Ancestry

Notes

References 
 Heiszler, Vilmos. Photo Habsburg: Frederick Habsburg and his Family.  Budapest: Corvina, 1989.
 Jewison, Glenn, and Jörg C. Steiner. "Erzherzog Friedrich"  (Austro-Hungarian Land Forces 1848–1918).
 Palmer, Alan. Twilight of the Habsburgs: The Life and Times of Emperor Francis Joseph. Atlantic Monthly Press; 1st Pbk. Ed edition.
 Stefanovics, Glenn W. "Friedrich Maria Albrecht Wilhelm Karl von Österreich-Toskana, Herzog von Teschen"

External links 

 

1856 births
1936 deaths
House of Habsburg
Austrian princes
Dukes of Teschen
Field marshals of Austria
People from Židlochovice
19th-century Austrian people
Austro-Hungarian military personnel of World War I
Austrian expatriates in Hungary
Czech expatriates in Hungary

Knights of the Golden Fleece of Austria
Grand Crosses of the Order of Saint Stephen of Hungary
Grand Crosses of the Military Order of Maria Theresa
Grand Crosses of the Military Order of Max Joseph
Recipients of the Order of Bravery, 1st class
Grand Croix of the Légion d'honneur
Recipients of the Military Merit Cross (Mecklenburg-Schwerin), 1st class
Recipients of the Order of the Netherlands Lion
Recipients of the Iron Cross (1914), 1st class
Recipients of the Pour le Mérite (military class)
Recipients of the Order of the White Eagle (Russia)
Recipients of the Order of St. Anna, 1st class
Grand Crosses of Military Merit
Annulled Honorary Knights Grand Cross of the Order of the Bath